Dunckley Pass is a high mountain pass in The Flat Tops mountains of western Colorado. Rio Blanco County Road 8, a gravel road, traverses the pass, which divides the watersheds of East Fork Williams Fork and Fish Creek.

The pass, part of the Flat Tops Trail Scenic and Historic Byway, is accessible to passenger cars, but only seasonally, generally from late May to October. The Dunckley Pass Overlook Picnic Site, near the actual pass, provides views of The Flat Tops.

References

External links

Mountain passes of Colorado
Landforms of Rio Blanco County, Colorado